Bent Nørgaard Sørensen (23 June 1926 – 25 June 2011) was a Danish footballer

Profile
Sørensen played most of his career for Vejle Boldklub, where he was the all-time top scorer with 157 goals in 200 matches. In 1956 he wrote club history scoring the winner, as Vejle Boldklub for the first time qualified for the best Danish league. In September 1958 he became VB's first Danish international player. He made his debut against Norway and scored the only goal of the match.

References

Danish men's footballers
Vejle Boldklub players
1926 births
2011 deaths
People from Vejle Municipality
Association football forwards
Sportspeople from the Region of Southern Denmark